Khwaja Mohamad Amin Darab Khwaja Mohamad Amin Darab was the last Persian 1890–1979), Kashmir's last Persian poet who left a lot of data on Kashmir heritage.
Khwaja Mohamad Amin Darab's 73 rare manuscripts, including 11 books, written by Darab have been put on display at the Amar Singh Club in Srinagar.

References

1979 deaths
Persian-language poets